Prorachias is a genus of spiders in the family Pycnothelidae. It was first described in 1924 by Mello-Leitão. , it contains only one Brazilian species, Prorachias bristowei.

References

Pycnothelidae
Monotypic Mygalomorphae genera
Spiders of Brazil